Edith Mayer is a former member of the Ohio House of Representatives.

External links
Profile on the Ohio Ladies' Gallery website

References

Members of the Ohio House of Representatives
Women state legislators in Ohio
Living people
Year of birth missing (living people)
21st-century American women